O. gazella  may refer to:
 Onthophagus gazella, the gazella scarab, a beetle species
 Oryx gazella, the gemsbok or gemsbuck, a large African antelope species

See also
 Gazella